Zamkowa Wola  is a village in the administrative district of Gmina Łagów, within Kielce County, Świętokrzyskie Voivodeship, in south-central Poland.

The village has a population of 366.

References

Zamkowa Wola